Kochgaon is a village under Sakomatha block in Biswanath district, Assam, India.

Location
National Highway 31C passes through Kochgaon.

References

Villages in Biswanath district